AADI, Asociación Argentina de Intérpretes, is a non-profit organization created in 1954.  It is responsible for the administration and distribution of the musical rights established in section 56 of Law 11.723. 

Its permanent action in defense of these rights and the national musical culture is carried out through public information and training of its members.

AADI  is a founding member of the Federación Iberolatinoamericana de Artistas Intérpretes y Ejecutantes -FILAIE- which groups similar organisations of Latin America, Spain and Portugal.

External links
 Official website

Argentine music